Eucereon cinctum is a moth of the subfamily Arctiinae. It was described by Schaus in 1896. It is found in Trinidad and Pará, Brazil.

References

cinctum
Moths described in 1896